Dessie Donnelly (born 1959 in Ballycastle, County Antrim) is a former Irish sportsman. He played hurling with his local club McQuillan Ballycastle and was a member of the Antrim senior inter-county team in the 1980s and 1990s.

Donnelly played in the Antrim side that reached the All-Ireland Senior Hurling Championship final in 1989, losing out to Tipperary GAA by 4-24 to 3-9 at Croke Park. Donnelly received an All-Star that year being named in corner back. He also captained the All Star team in their exhibition game against Tipperary in the SkyDome, Toronto.

Honours

Club
Antrim Senior Hurling Championship (7) 
1975, 1978, 1979, 1980, 1983, 1984, 1986
Ulster Senior Club Hurling Championship (6) 
1978, 1979, 1980, 1983, 1984, 1986
All-Ireland Club Senior Hurling Championship (0)
Runners-up 1980

Inter-county
Ulster Senior Hurling Championship (3)
1989, 1990, 1991
All-Ireland Senior Hurling Championship (0)
Runners-up 1989
All-Star (1)
1989
All-Ireland Senior B Hurling Championship (3)
1978, 1981, 1982

References

1959 births
Living people
Ballycastle McQuillan hurlers
Antrim inter-county hurlers
Ulster inter-provincial hurlers